Allison Forsyth (born 14 October 1978) is a Canadian former alpine skier from Nanaimo, British Columbia, who competed in the 2002 Winter Olympics.

She retired from competitive skiing after the 2007–08 season, due to injuries suffered over her career, and to start a family. 

Forsyth alleges she was sexually abused by Alpine Canada coach Bertrand Charest. In 2017, Charest was sentenced to 12 years in prison for sex crimes against young skiers. He appealed, and his sentence was reduced to 57 months. He has since been granted parole. Forsyth has an ongoing lawsuit against Alpine Canada.

Canada Soccer hired Forsyth "to get us to where we want to be" with SafeSport.

Forsyth is divorced from Steve Grywul, and has three children, two boys and one girl.

References

1978 births
Living people
Canadian female alpine skiers
Olympic alpine skiers of Canada
Sportspeople from Nanaimo
Alpine skiers at the 2002 Winter Olympics